The Custody of the Holy Land (Latin: Custodia Terræ Sanctæ) is a custodian priory of the Order of Friars Minor in Jerusalem, founded as the Province of the Holy Land in 1217 by Saint Francis of Assisi, who had also founded the Franciscan Order in 1209. In 1342, the Franciscans were declared by two papal bulls as the official custodians of the Holy Places in the name of the Catholic Church.

The Custody headquarters are located in the Monastery of Saint Saviour, a 16th-century Franciscan monastery near the New Gate in the Old City of Jerusalem. The office can bestow—only to those entering its office—the Jerusalem Pilgrim's Cross upon deserving Catholic visitors to the city.

The Franciscans trace their presence in the Holy Land to 1217. By 1229, the friars had a small house near the fifth station of the Via Dolorosa and in 1272 were permitted to settle in the Cenacle on Mount Zion. In 1309 they also settled in Bethlehem and the Holy Sepulchre along with the Canons Regular.

After the final fall of the second Crusader Kingdom of Jerusalem in 1291, the title of Latin Patriarch of Jerusalem was vested in the Custody ex officio in Rome, while resuming its activities in the Holy Land, including surveilling the accolades of the Order of the Holy Sepulchre 1342–1489 until its Grand Magistry was vested in the papacy. Following the restoration of the Latin Patriarchate of Jerusalem as residential episcopal see in 1847, the Patriarch henceforth additionally assumed the position of the order's ecclesiastical superior, eventually supplanting the Custody of the Holy land as Grand Prior of the Order of the Holy Sepulchre.

The Custody of the Holy Land has repeatedly expressed concern about the survival of the Christians in the Holy Land, including the strained situation for Christians in the rest of the Middle East.

Between 2004 and 2016, the Custodial Curia was led by Custos Fr. Pierbattista Pizzaballa. Since 2016, the chief custodian has been .

Mission
The mission of the Custody of the Holy Land is to guard "the grace of the Holy Places" of the Holy Land and the rest of the Middle East, "sanctified by the presence of Jesus", as well as pilgrims visiting them, on behalf of the Catholic Church.

History

An online history, The Franciscan Presence in the Holy Land, has been prepared by the Custodian Emeritus (later Latin Patriarch of Jerusalem), Pierbattista Pizzaballa, OFM.

The Franciscan presence in the Holy Land started in 1217, when the province of Syria was established, with Frater (Brother) Elias of Cortona as Minister. By 1229, the friars had a small house near the fifth station of the Via Dolorosa. In 1272 the Sultan Baibars of Egypt permitted the Franciscans to settle in the Cenacle (also called the Upper Room) on Mount Sion. Later on, in 1309, they also settled in Bethlehem and in the Holy Sepulchre, along with the Canons Regular.

During the difficult years of the Great War, many friars belonging to the enemy nations fighting against the Ottomans and Germans were deported. In 1917, when the Italian friars were just about to be sent away, reprieve came in the last minute, which was attributed to the triduum celebrated that year in honour of St Anthony of Padua, a saint venerated for his miracles. Consequently, in 1920, St Anthony was chosen as the patron saint of the  Custody.

In 1333, Robert d'Anjou, King of Naples, and his wife, Sancia of Majorca, bought the Cenacle from the Sultan of Egypt and gave it to the Franciscans. In 1342, Pope Clement VI, by the Papal bulls Gratiam agimus and Nuper charissimae declared the Franciscans as the official custodians of the Holy Places in the name of the Catholic Church. A portion reads:

A short time ago good news from the king and queen reached our Apostolic See relating that, at great cost and following difficult negotiations, they had obtained a concession from the Sultan of Babylon [that is, Cairo], who to the intense shame of Christians occupies the Holy Sepulchre of the Lord and the other Holy Places beyond the sea that were sanctified by the blood of this same Redeemer, to wit that friars of your Order may reside continuously in the church known as the Sepulchre and celebrate there Solemn Sung Masses and the Divine Office in the manner of the several friars of this Order who are already present in this place; moreover, this same Sultan has also conceded to the King and Queen the Cenacle of the Lord, the chapel where the Holy Spirit was manifested to the Apostles and the other chapel in which Christ appeared to the Apostles after his resurrection, in the presence of Blessed Thomas; and also the news of how the Queen built a convent on Mount Zion where, as is known, the Cenacle and the said chapels are located; where for some time she has had the intention of supporting twelve friars of your Order to assure the divine Liturgy in the church of the Holy Sepulchre, along with three laymen charged with serving the friars and seeing to their needs.

The Custodian was described as the "Guardian of Mount Zion in Jerusalem". Between 1342 and 1489, the Custodian was the head of the Order of the Holy Sepulchre and held the ex officio title of Latin Patriarch of Jerusalem. From 1374, he was based at the Basilica di San Lorenzo fuori le Mura in Rome.

In 1489, Pope Innocent VIII suppressed the Order of the Holy Sepulchre and ruled that it was to be merged with the Knights Hospitaller. In 1496, Pope Alexander VI, restored the Order of Holy Sepulchre to independent status, but the Custodian ceased to be the head of the Order. Instead, a Grand Master of the Order was created, and the office vested in the papacy. The Custodian continued to act as the Latin Patriarch of Jerusalem ex officio until 1830, and by being appointed to both offices until 1905. The office of Grand Master remained vested in the papacy until 1949. On 29 August 2011, Archbishop Edwin Frederick O'Brien was appointed by Pope Benedict XVI Grand Master to succeed Cardinal John Patrick Foley, who resigned the office on 24 February 2011 due to ill health. The Order is a member of many international bodies and has observer status at others (such as the United Nations). The Grand Master is a papal viceroy who assists Vatican diplomacy with procedural support for making motions, proposing amendments and requiring votes in the sphere of international diplomacy.

Franciscan friars cared for the Cenacle, restoring also the building with Gothic vaults, until the Ottoman Empire captured Jerusalem and banished all Christians. After the Franciscan friars' eviction, the Cenacle was transformed into a mosque. Christians were not allowed to use the room for prayer until the establishment of the State of Israel in 1948.

In 1623, the Latin Province of the Holy Land was split into a number of smaller entities, called Custodies – creating Custodies of Cyprus, Syria, and the Holy Land proper. The Custody of the Holy Land included the monasteries of Saint-Jean-d'Acre, Antioch, Sidon, Tyre, Jerusalem and Jaffa.

In 1847, a resident Latin Patriarchate of Jerusalem was restored in the Holy Land, together with the Order of the Holy Sepulchre. The Latin Patriarch of Jerusalem became the ecclesiastical superior of the Order, and eventually assumed the title Grand Prior, supplanting the Custodian. The office of Grand Master still remained vested in the papacy.

In 1937, Alberto Gori was appointed Custodian of the Holy Land, an office he would occupy until 1949, when he was appointed Latin Patriarch of Jerusalem, an office he held until 1970. In Gori's reports to the Vatican in the 1940s, he was critical of Jewish and later Israeli forces, whom he accused of destruction of holy places. Despite repeated Israeli assurances that Israel will guarantee freedom of religion and safeguard the Holy Places of all religions, Pope Pius XII issued several encyclicals expressing concerns about the holy places as well as access. In 1949, at the time of appointing Gori to the office of Latin Patriarch, Pius XII also relinquished the title of Grand Master.

Organisation 

On 15 May 2004, Fr. Pierbattista Pizzaballa was appointed Custodian of the Holy Land, succeeding Giovanni Battistelli, who held the office for six years. On Friday, 28 June 2013, Pope Francis confirmed that he would continue as Custodian for at least a further three years. Pierbattista Pizzaballa was born in Cologno al Serio, Italy, on 21 April 1965. He was ordained a priest in September 1990. Since 2016, the chief custodian has been Francesco Patton.

The Custodian of the Holy Land, also called the International Custodian of the Holy Land, is appointed by the General Definitorium of the Order of Friars Minor (OFM) of the Franciscans and approved by the Pope and the Holy See.

The Custodian has the role of Minister Provincial (i.e. major superior) of the Franciscans living in Israel, Palestine, Jordan, Syria, Lebanon, parts of Egypt, Cyprus and Rhodes. The Custody has about 300 friars and about 100 sisters in these countries. The Franciscans serve the principal Christian shrines, including the Church of the Holy Sepulchre in Jerusalem, Basilica of the Nativity in Bethlehem and the Basilica of the Annunciation in Nazareth.

During the later Middle Ages and early modern times the Custody was official provider of hospitality for Latin pilgrims to the Holy Land, i.e. Westerners be they Catholic or Protestant. Such facilities existed primarily at Jaffa and in Jerusalem

Properties in the Holy Land
 
The Franciscan order owns a great deal of property in the Holy Land, second only to the Orthodox Church of Jerusalem. In addition to the major shrines of the Church of the Holy Sepulchre in Jerusalem and the Basilica of the Nativity in Bethlehem, which the Franciscans own and administer in common with the Jerusalem Orthodox and Armenian Orthodox patriarchates, the Custodian also cares for 74 shrines and sanctuaries throughout the Holy Land, including properties in Syria and Jordan.

In 1909, in the territory of the Latin Patriarchate of Jerusalem, re-instituted in 1847, the Franciscans had 24 convents and 15 parishes, including numerous schools.

The Custodian's offices are at the Monastery of St Saviour, a 16th-century Franciscan monastery near New Gate in the Old City of Jerusalem.

Activities

Education
Schools founded by the Franciscan friars include Terra Santa College in Nicosia, Cyprus and 
Magnificat Institute in Jerusalem.

Media centre
The Custody has a communications department in charge of the official media in the Holy Land, which is based at the Terra Sancta College in Jerusalem and includes a multimedia centre broadcasting news programmes in different languages, and the editorial office of the Christian Media Center and of the French-language Terre Sainte Magazine.

Current issues

Fr. Pizzaballa expressed concern view that many Christians were leaving the region, especially the Christians of the Palestinian Territories, and that housing assistance was being offered to discourage emigration. He attributed the exodus to lack of prospects for the future and the political situation.

In 2011, the Catholic News Service (CNS) website aired an interview on Vatican Radio in which Father Pizzaballa alluded to the tense situation for Christians in Syria and Egypt.

List of Custodians

13th century
 1217 – Elia da Cortona
 1219 – Saint Francis of Assisi
 1247 – Giacomo (Narciso?)
 1266 – Giacomo da Puy
 ? – Vincentius de Burgundia
 1270? – Giovannino da Parma
 1286 – Geleberto
14th century
<li value=7>1306 – Guido
<li> 1310 – Rogero Guarini
<li> 1328 – Nicolò da San Martino
<li> 1330 – Giovanni Fedanzola
1333 – Rogero Guarini
<li value=11>1337 – Giovanni di Stefano
<li> 1337 – Giacomo Normanno
<li> ? – Nicola di Giovanni
<li> 1363 – Bernardino da Padova
<li> 1372 – Antonio di Giacomo
<li> 1376 – Nicolò da Creta (o Candia)
<li> 1382 – Giovanni
<li> 1384 – Nicolò da Venezia
<li> 1388 – Gerardo Calvetti
15th century
<li value=20> 1400 – Nicolò Coronario
<li> 1405 – Nicolò di Pietro
<li> 1414 – Pascutius Davini de Assisio
<li> 1421 – Giacomo di Antonio
<li> 1424 – Giovanni Belloro
<li> 1430 – Luigi da Bologna
<li> 1434 – Giacomo Delfino
<li> 1438 – Gandolfo da Sicilia
<li> 1446 – Baldassare da Santa Maria
<li> 1455 – Antonio da Mugnano
<li> 1462 – Gabriele Mezzavacca
<li> 1464 – Paolo d'Albenga
<li> 1467 – Francesco da Piacenza
<li> 1472 – Andrea da Parma
<li> 1475 – Giacomo d'Alessandria
<li> 1478 – Giovanni de Thomacellis
<li> 1481 – Paolo da Canneto
<li> 1484 – Bernardino da Parma
1487 – Francesco da Perugia
<li value=38>1487 – Bernardino Caimo
<li> 1489 – Bartolomeo da Piacenza
<li> 1493 – Francesco Suriano
<li> 1495 – Angelo da Foligno
1496 – Bartolomeo da Piacenza
<li value=42>1499 – Antonio Gozze de Regnis
16th century
<li value=43> 1501 – Mauro da San Bernardino
<li> 1504 – Luigi da Napoli
<li> 1507 – Bernardino del Vecchio
1512 – Francesco Suriano
<li value=46>1514 – Nicolò da Tossignano
<li> 1517 – Zenobio da Firenze
<li> 1518 – Gabriele ?
<li> 1519 – Angelo da Ferrara
<li> 1528 – Giovanni
<li> 1532 – Mario da Messina
<li> 1532 – Battista da Macerata
<li> 1535 – Tomaso da Norcia
<li> 1541 – Dionisio da Sarcognano
<li> 1545 – Felice da Venezia
<li> 1544 – Giorgio Bosnese
1545 – Felice da Venezia
<li value=57>1547 – Bonaventura Corsetti
<li> 1551 – Bonifacio Stefani
<li> 1559 – Antonio da Bergamo
<li> 1560 – Aurelio da Griano
1564 – Bonifacio Stefani
<li value=61>1565 – Bernardino da Collestate
<li> 1566 – Girolamo da Fossato
<li> 1568 – Angelo da Portomaurizio
<li> 1568 – Gian Francesco d'Arsignano Vicent
<li> 1571 – Antonio da Sant'Angelo
<li> 1572 – Geremia da Brescia
<li> 1580 – Giovanni da Bergamo
<li> 1581 – Angelo Stella
<li> 1584 – Paolino Olivoli
<li> 1585 – Accursio da Quinzano
<li> 1588 – Gian Battista da Montegiano
<li> 1590 – Francesco da Spello
<li> 1593 – Felice Ranieri da Fratta
<li> 1593 – Gian Francesco da Salandra
<li> 1597 – Evangelista da Gabiano
17th century
<li value=76>1600 – Francesco Manerba
<li> 1603 – Cesario da Trino
<li> 1608 – Gaudenzio Saibanti
<li> 1612 – Angelo da Messina
<li> 1616 – Basilio Basili
<li> 1619 – Francesco Dulcedo
<li> 1620 – Tommaso Obicini
<li> 1621 – Ambrogio Pantoliano
<li> 1622 – Francesco Spinelli
<li> 1625 – Sante da Messina
<li> 1628 – Diego Campanile
<li> 1632 – Paolo da Lodi
<li> 1634 – Francesco da Cattaro
<li> 1637 – Andrea d'Arco
<li> 1642 – Pietro Verniero
<li> 1645 – Francesco Merisi
<li> 1648 – Antonio da Gaeta
1651 – Ambrogio Pantoliano
<li value=93>1652 – Mariano Morone
<li> 1659 – Eusebio Valles
<li> 1664 – Francesco M. Rhini
<li> 1669 – Teofilo Testa
<li> 1673 – Claudio Gavazzi
<li> 1675 – Tomaso da Caltagirone
<li> 1675 – Giovanni Bonsignori
<li> 1678 – Pier Marino Sormani
<li> 1683 – Pier Antonio Grassi
<li> 1686 – Angelico da Milano
<li> 1689 – Gregorio da Parghelia
<li> 1691 – Gian Battista D'Atina
<li> 1695 – Baldassare Caldera
<li> 1697 – Francesco da Santo Floro
18th century
<li value=107>1701 – Bonaventura da Majori
<li> 1704 – Benedetto da Bari
<li> 1705 – Costantino Ultorchi
<li> 1706 – Gaetano Potestà 
<li> 1710 – Lorenzo Cozza
<li> 1716 – Giuseppe Maria da Perugia
<li> 1720 – Gian Filippo da Milano
<li> 1722 – Giacomo da Lucca
<li> 1730 – Andrea da Montoro
<li> 1735 – Angelico da Gazolo
<li> 1740 – Paolo da Laurino
1743 – Giacomo da Lucca
<li value=118>1744 – Desiderio da Casabasciana
<li> 1751 – Prospero Zinelli
<li> 1754 – Pio da Mentone
<li> 1756 – Domenico da Venezia
<li> 1762 – Paolo da Piacenza
<li> 1767 – Luigi da Bastia
<li> 1773 – Valeriano Bellandi
<li> 1773 – Gian Domenico da Levigliano
<li> 1795 – Placido da Roma
<li> 1798 – Ladislao da Viterbo
19th century
<li value=128>1801 – Zenobio Puccini
<li> 1805 – Bonaventura da Nola
<li> 1808 – Giuseppe M. Pierallini
<li> 1815 – Girolamo da Osimo
<li> 1817 – Salvatore Antonio da Malta
<li> 1820 – Ugolino Cesarini
<li> 1822 – Gian Antonio da Rogliano
<li> 1825 – Tomaso da Montasola
<li> 1831 – Francesco di S. Lorenzo alle Grotte
<li> 1835 – Francesco Saverio da Malta
<li> 1838 – Perpetuo Guasco
<li> 1841 – Cherubino Maria da Cori
<li> 1843 – Cherubino da Civezza
<li> 1847 – Bernardino Trionfetti
<li> 1857 – Bonaventura Robotti
<li> 1863 – Serafino Milani
<li> 1874 – Gaudenzio Bonfigli
<li> 1880 – Guido Corbelli
<li> 1886 – Aurelio Briante
<li> 1888 – Giacomo Ghezzi
1894 – Aurelio Briante
20th century
<li value=148>1900 – Frediano Giannini
<li> 1906 – Roberto Razzoli
<li> 1914 – Onorato Carcaterra
<li> 1915 – Serafino Cimino
<li> 1918 – Ferdinando Diotallevi; as Custos he was also member of the Pro-Jerusalem Society's leading Council 
<li> 1925 – Aurelio Marotta
<li> 1931 – Nazzareno Jacopozzi
<li> 1937 – Alberto Gori
<li> 1950 – Giacinto Maria Faccio
<li> 1955 – Angelico Lazzeri
<li> 1957 – Alfredo Polidori
<li> 1962 – Vincenzo Cappiello
<li> 1968 – Alfonso Calabrese
<li> 1969 – Erminio Roncari
<li> 1974 – Maurilio Sacchi
<li> 1980 – Ignazio Mancini
<li> 1986 – Carlo Cecchitelli
<li> 1992 – Giuseppe Nazzaro
<li> 1998 – Giovanni Battistelli
21st century
<li value=167>2004 – Pierbattista Pizzaballa
<li> 2016 – Francesco Patton

See also
 Latin Patriarchate of Jerusalem
 Catholic Church in Palestine
 Catholic Church in Israel
 Palestinian Christians
 Holy See–Israel relations
 Order of the Holy Sepulchre
 Brotherhood of the Holy Sepulchre
 ATS Association of the Holy Land

References

Further reading
 Masha Halevi, Between Faith and Science: Franciscan Archaeology in the Service of the Holy Places, Middle Eastern Studies, Volume 48, Issue 2, 2012, pp. 249–267

External links
 Official website of the Custody of the Holy Land